Haberfield is a suburb in the Inner West of Sydney, in the state of New South Wales, Australia. Haberfield is located 6.5 kilometres west of the Sydney central business district in the local government area of the Inner West Council. 

Haberfield sits south of Iron Cove, which is part of Sydney Harbour. It is bounded to the east by the Hawthorne Canal, to the northwest by the Iron Cove Creek canal and to the southwest by Parramatta Road. Its main road is Ramsay Street and the point of land that faces Iron Cove, Dobroyd Point, is a historical locality of Sydney. Haberfield was dubbed "the garden suburb" in the early 20th century and retains its well-kept parks, tree-lined streets and fine Federation-era houses with immaculate gardens. The entire suburb is heritage-listed. It is also known for its Italian culture.

History 
Haberfield was named by early landholder Richard Stanton, after his wife's financial benefactors of his wife's family Lord Haberfield. Stantons wife's maiden name was Nichols.

Aboriginal prehistory
The area which comprises Haberfield was part of the broader area in which lived people from the Darug tribe known variously as the Wangals or Cadigals from the Eora nation. The modern-day Hawthorne Canal is believed to be the border between these two tribes. There is no specific evidence of indigenous settlement in the area. However, the area that is now Haberfield was one of the last areas in the inner-west to be developed and so, in the late 19th century, it again became a home to local kooris.

European settlement
Nicholas Bayly, a soldier, received the first land grant in the area in 1803 but sold it two years later to Simeon Lord who called it Dobroyde Estate. Lord gave the land to his daughter Sarah Ann and her new husband David Ramsay as a wedding present in 1825 and it stayed in the hands of the Ramsay family until the end of the century. The Ramsays developed orchards in the area and built a number of fine houses for various members of the family including Yasmar (Ramsay spelt backwards) and St David's Presbyterian church.  They also created four of the suburb's current streets: Ramsay Street, Dalhousie Street (named after the Ramsay's historic home in Scotland), Boomerang Street and Waratah Street.

In 1901, landholder Richard Stanton bought  from two Ramsay children and subdivided the area to create a garden suburb. Sydney had recently suffered outbreaks of the bubonic plague in overcrowded parts of the inner city and the garden suburb movement was a response to that, encouraging fresh air. He also claimed the development to be "slumless, laneless and publess". The houses were designed by the architectural firm Spencer, Stansfield and Wormald. Stanton named the suburb 'Haberfield', after the English branch of his family. The fact that the development started in 1901 and a number of the early streets were named after prominent federal politicians has led to the suburb also being known as 'The Federation Suburb'.

Heritage
The majority of houses in Haberfield are protected under a 'heritage order', which is the main reason why so many original Victorian and Federation houses still exist in the area. Renovations and additions to both houses and properties must follow strict guidelines ensuring they stay true to the era's style. Some examples of rules include: banning the addition of second storeys unless in the existing roof space, banning the demolishing of any protected houses, ensuring a 50:50 ratio of 'hard surface' to 'soft surface' on the property, ensuring house exteriors are painted in federation colours. Houses must also have a roof consisting of terracotta or slate tiles.

One notable landmark is Yasmar, at 185 Parramatta Road. Formerly known as Yasmar Hostel, this building was built circa 1870 of dressed stone, with a verandah and iron columns. It also features French windows and extensive cedar joinery, and is set in a lush garden. It was later part of Yasmar Juvenile Centre and is listed on the Register of the National Estate.

Haberfield has a heritage association to help residents maintain their heritage properties.

21st century
A proposal was made by McDonald's to build a drive-thru outlet on Parramatta Road in Haberfield in 2011. This was fiercely opposed by a group of local residents who wanted to preserve the suburb's "cultural and architectural heritage." The development application was rejected by Ashfield Council in 2009, however McDonald's appealed to the Land and Environment Court of New South Wales and the appeal was upheld in 2011, but with modifications to the proposed building. Following the opening of McDonald's in Haberfield, there were complaints about odours coming from the site in 2012 and 2013.

Heritage listings 
Haberfield has a number of heritage-listed sites, including:
 51- 53 Dalhousie Street: St David's Uniting Church
 16 Deakin Avenue: Derrylyn
 185 Parramatta Road: Yasmar
 5 Rogers Avenue: The Bunyas
 11 St Davids Road: St. David's Road Depot

Commercial area

Haberfield also has a strong Italian influence, which is most evident in the local shops along Ramsay Street, close to the intersection with Dalhousie Street. These include a hand made pasta shop, a traditional Italian bakery, traditional and contemporary Italian pastry shops and gelaterias, and Italian delicatessens and butchers, as well as many Italian cafes, coffee shops and restaurants. The primary supermarket in Haberfield is IGA Lamonica which also has a well-stocked delicatessen inside. Many of the shops in Haberfield have received various awards for their quality.

Schools
Haberfield has three primary schools but no high schools. Two of the schools are state run: Haberfield Public School on the corner of Bland Street Denman avenue and Dobroyd Point Public School on Waratah Street. The third is the St Joan of Arc Catholic School on Dalhousie Street opposite St Joan of Arc Church.

Transport

The Inner West Light Rail skirts the suburb's eastern border with Leichhardt. Because of this, none of the three stops serving Haberfield are centrally located within the suburb. Hawthorne (near Barton Avenue) and Marion (near Marion Street) are the primary stops serving Haberfield. Taverners Hill (near Parramatta Road) is in the south-east corner of the suburb at the southern border with Summer Hill and the south-eastern border with Lewisham, in addition to the border with Leichhardt. The service offers a direct link to Pyrmont and Darling Harbour and provides interchanges with Lewisham railway station on the Inner West & Leppington Line and Dulwich Hill railway station on the Bankstown Line.

Bus routes 461 (from the city down Parramatta Rd), 406 (from either Five Dock or Hurlstone Park through Dalhousie St), 438 (from city or Abbotsford via Ramsay St) and 439 (from city or Mortlake via Ramsay St) serve the suburb.

Summer Hill railway station, on the T2 Inner West & Leppington Line is close to the suburbs southern border. Five Dock railway station on the Sydney Metro West rapid transit line will serve the neighbouring suburb of Five Dock.

In July 2019, the Westconnex M4 East tunnel opened to traffic - with no traffic lights for 51 km from Glenbrook (near Penrith) to Haberfield.

Population

Demographics
At the 2016 census, there were 6,457 residents in Haberfield. The population was older than average, with a median age of 44 and with 19.6% of people aged 65 and over.  66.6% of people were born in Australia. The next most common countries of birth were Italy 12.7% and England 2.8%. The most common responses for religion in the census were Catholic 47.5% and No Religion 25.2%. 64.8% of people spoke only English at home. Other languages spoken at home included Italian 20.7% and Greek 2.1%.

Notable residents
The following people were either born in, or lived in, Haberfield:
 Norman Allan (1901–1977), NSW police commissioner from 1962–1972
 Bronwyn Oliver (1959–2006), sculptor
 Richard Glover
 Ellen Fanning (moved elsewhere about 2016)
 Odette (attended Haberfield public school)
 Mia Simos (attended St Joan of Arc) (major slay)

Gallery

Churches
Haberfield has four historical churches in Dalhousie Street: St Oswalds Anglican Church, Saint Joan of Arc Catholic Church, St Davids Uniting Church, Haberfield Baptist Church.

Houses
About 1500 houses were constructed in this and adjoining areas to designs by architects J Spencer Stansfeld and D Wormald, to Federation or Bungalow styles.

Haberfield espoused the philosophy of the Garden Suburb with its gardens containing distinctive planting, fences, gates and curving tiled paths. Houses in Haberfield were typically 'detached' double-brick dwellings situated on their own block of land measuring 50' x 150' (15 m x 45 m). No two houses were alike, although there were many common themes throughout the suburb. The roofs were either slate or Marseilles tile. All had front verandahs. Decorative features typically used in this area include leadlight windows depicting Australian flora and fauna, Art Nouveau timber detailing and tuckpointed brickwork.

Houses listed under the NSW Heritage Act: 
 Bunyas, 5 Rogers Avenue, Haberfield
 Derrylyn, 16 Deakin Avenue, Haberfield
 Yasmar, 185 Parramatta Road, Haberfield

Parks
Several parks lie within the suburb of Haberfield such as; Algie Park, Robson Park, Reg Cody Reserve, Hawthorne Canal and Wadim 'Bill' Jegorow Reserve

See also 

 Australian non-residential architectural styles
 List of Anglican churches in the Diocese of Sydney

References

External links

The Haberfield Association
The Haberfield Heritage
Haberfield Heritage's photostream
Haberfield, the Garden Suburb
 [CC-By-SA]
 [CC-By-SA]

 
Suburbs of Sydney
Inner West
Hume Highway